Blind Justice is a 1934 British thriller film directed by Bernard Vorhaus and starring Eva Moore, Frank Vosper, Geraldine Fitzgerald, Roger Livesey, and John Mills. The screenplay concerns a woman who is blackmailed by a criminal, who has discovered that her brother was shot as a coward during World War I.

It was made at Twickenham Studios as a quota quickie for release by Universal Pictures. It was based on Recipe for Murder, a 1932 play by Arnold Ridley. A review of the play, mentioning the forthcoming film, was the first use of the word whodunit in print.

Cast
 Eva Moore as Fluffy  
 Frank Vosper as Dick Cheriton  
 John Stuart as John Summers  
 Geraldine Fitzgerald as Peggy Summers  
 John Mills as Ralph Summers  
 Lucy Beaumont as Mrs. Summers  
 Hay Petrie as Harry  
 Roger Livesey as Gilbert Jackson  
 Charles Carson as Dr. Naylor

References

Bibliography
 Chibnall, Steve. Quota Quickies: The Birth of the British 'B' Film. British Film Institute, 2007.

External links

1934 films
British crime thriller films
British films based on plays
Films set in England
Films directed by Bernard Vorhaus
Films shot at Twickenham Film Studios
Quota quickies
British World War I films
British black-and-white films
1930s crime thriller films
1930s English-language films
1930s British films